Dana Lombardy is a game designer who has worked primarily on board games.

Career
Dana Lombardy designed the award-winning Streets of Stalingrad board wargame, published in 1979 with three separate editions since its first release. He is also known for his appearances on various television shows, including multiple episodes of the History Channel's Tales of the Gun. Lombardy has contributed as an editor, cartographer, graphic artist, and designer to many books, games, and magazines. He served as publisher of Napoleon Journal from 1996 to 2000.

Lombardy contributed the "Gaming" column to Asimov's Science Fiction from January 1983 to April 1986, which was then continued by Matthew Costello.

References

Board game designers
Living people
Place of birth missing (living people)
Year of birth missing (living people)